The men's tournament of the 2016 European Curling Championships was held from November 18 to 26 in Renfrewshire, Scotland. The winners of the Group C tournament in Ljubljana, Slovenia will move on to the Group B tournament. The top eight men's teams at the 2016 European Curling Championships will represent their respective nations at the 2017 Ford World Men's Curling Championship in Edmonton, Alberta, Canada.

Group A

Teams

Round-robin standings
Final round-robin standings

Round-robin results

Draw 1
Saturday, November 19, 9:00

Draw 2
Saturday, November 19, 19:00

Draw 3
Sunday, November 20, 12:00

Draw 4
Monday, November 21, 8:00

Draw 5
Monday, November 21, 16:00

Draw 6
Tuesday, November 22, 9:00

Draw 7
Tuesday, November 22, 19:00

Draw 8
Wednesday, November 23, 12:00

Draw 9
Wednesday, November 23, 20:00

Placement game
Thursday, November 24, 14:00

World Challenge Games
The World Challenge Games are held between the eighth-ranked team in the Group A round robin and the winner of the Group B tournament to determine which of these two teams will play at the World Championships.

Challenge 1
Friday, November 25, 19:00

Challenge 2
Saturday, November 26, 9:00

Challenge 3
Saturday, November 26, 14:00

Playoffs

Semifinals
Thursday, November 27, 19:00

Bronze-medal game
Friday, November 25, 19:00

Gold-medal game
Saturday, November 26, 15:00

Player percentages
Round Robin only

Group B

Teams

Round-robin standings

Round-robin results

Group A

Draw 1
Saturday, November 19, 9:00 & 15:00

Draw 2
Sunday, November 20, 8:00

In the France vs. Israel game team France ran out of time and forfeited the game.

Draw 3
Sunday, November 20, 16:00 & Monday, November 21, 16:00 & 20:00

Draw 4
Monday, November 21, 8:00, 12:00, 16:00 & Tuesday, November 22, 12:00

Draw 5
Monday, November 21, 16:00 & Tuesday, November 22, 16:00, 20:00

Draw 6
Monday, November 21, 8:00 & Wednesday, November 23, 12:00

Draw 7
Wednesday, November 23, 20:00

Group B

Draw 1
Saturday, November 19, 15:00 & 20:00

Draw 2
Sunday, November 20, 8:00, 12:00 & 16:00

Draw 3
Monday, November 21, 8:00

Draw 4
Monday, November 21, 16:00 & Wednesday, November 23, 16:00

Draw 5
Tuesday, November 22, 8:00

Draw 6
Tuesday, November 22, 16:00

Draw 7
Wednesday, November 23, 8:00

Tiebreakers
Thursday, November 24, 9:00

Relegation round

Relegation Semifinals
Thursday, November 24, 20:00

Relegation Final
Friday, November 25, 19:00

Playoffs

Quarterfinals
Thursday, November 24, 14:30

Semifinals
Thursday, November 24, 20:00

Bronze-medal game
Friday, November 25, 13:00

Gold-medal game
Friday, November 25, 13:00

Group C

Teams

Round-robin standings
Final round-robin standings

Round-robin results

Draw 1

Draw 2

Draw 3

Draw 4

Draw 5

Draw 6

Draw 7

Draw 8

Draw 9

Draw 10

Draw 11

Playoffs

1 vs. 2

Winner advances to Group B competitions.
Loser advances to Second Place Game.

3 vs. 4

Winner advances to Second Place Game.

Second Place Game

Winner advances to Group B competitions.

References
General

Specific

European Curling Championships Men's tournament
European Curling Championships